The men's parallel giant slalom event in snowboarding at the 2006 Winter Olympics was held in Bardonecchia, a village in the Province of Turin, Italy. The competition took place on 22 February 2006.

Medalists

Qualification
The qualification runs started at 10 a.m.(UTC+1)

The athletes were allowed two runs, one on the blue course and one on the red course.  The two times were added, and the top 16 snowboarders moved on to the 1/8 finals.

Elimination round
The elimination round started at 1 p.m.(UTC+1)

Medal round

Classification 5–8

References

Snowboarding at the 2006 Winter Olympics
Men's events at the 2006 Winter Olympics